Pellafol is a commune in the Isère department in southeastern France.

Geography

Neighboring communes
Corps, Cordéac, Ambel, Beaufin, Saint-Étienne-en-Dévoluy.

History
Historically, Pellafol was a former fort château.

Administration

Since 2014, Thierry Joubert has been the mayor of Pellafol. He was re-elected in the 2020 municipal elections.

Population

See also
Communes of the Isère department

References

Communes of Isère